Martin Neuner (14 December 1900 – 2 August 1944) was a German ski jumper who competed in the 1928 Winter Olympics.

References

1900 births
1944 deaths
German male ski jumpers
Olympic ski jumpers of Germany
Ski jumpers at the 1928 Winter Olympics